Tropiocolotes tassiliensis  is a species of gecko of the family Gekkonidae. It is found in the Sahara Desert.

References

tassiliensis 
Geckos of Africa
Reptiles of North Africa
Reptiles described in 2022